Vauderens railway station is a railway station in the municipality of Ursy, in the Swiss canton of Fribourg. It is an intermediate stop on the standard gauge Lausanne–Bern line of Swiss Federal Railways.

Services 
 the following services stop at Vauderens:

References

External links 
 
 

Railway stations in the canton of Fribourg
Swiss Federal Railways stations